Al Bustān is a village in Muscat, in eastern Oman. (23°34'15.02";  58°36'32.70"E, 8 m altitude). This cemetery was used during the Samad Late Iron Age.

Overview
In 1991 the Ministry of National Heritage and Culture became aware of this cemetery, close to the Al-Bustan Palace.

In the same year a team from the German Mining Museum in Bochum excavated seven graves.

Sources
Paul Yule, Die Gräberfelder in Samad al-Shan (Sultanat Oman): Materialien zu einer Kulturgeschichte (2001), Taf. 482-500 .
Paul Yule, Cross-roads – Early and Late Iron Age South-eastern Arabia, Abhandlungen Deutsche Orient-Gesellschaft, vol. 30, Wiesbaden 2014, 89 
Paul A. Yule, Valourising the Samad Late Iron Age, Arabian Archaeology and Epigraphy 27/1, 2016, 31‒71.

External links
 Archaeology of Oman
http://heidicon.ub.uni-heidelberg.de/pool/oman

See also

List of lighthouses in Oman

References

History of Oman
Archaeological sites in Oman
Populated places in the Muscat Governorate
Lighthouses in Oman